Jean-Christophe, Prince Napoléon, Prince of Montfort (birth name: Jean-Christophe Louis Ferdinand Albéric Napoléon; born 11 July 1986, France) is the head of the former Imperial House of France, and heir of Napoleon Bonaparte, the First Emperor of the French.

Family background
Prince Jean-Christophe was born in Saint-Raphaël, Var, France. He is the son of Prince Charles Napoléon and his first wife Princess Béatrice of Bourbon-Two Sicilies, daughter of the late Prince Ferdinand of Bourbon, Duke of Castro, a claimant to headship of the former Royal House of the Two Sicilies. His parents divorced on 2 May 1989, two months before Jean-Christophe's 3rd birthday.

Jean-Christophe is the great-great-great-grand-nephew of Emperor Napoleon I (who has no legitimate direct descendants) through the emperor's youngest brother, Jérôme, King of Westphalia. Through his mother, he is a descendant of King Louis XIV of France and through his great-grandmother, Princess Clémentine of Belgium, he descends from Leopold II of Belgium, William IV, Prince of Orange, Charles III of Spain, Frederick William I of Prussia, George II of Great Britain and Louis Philippe I, King of the French, who was the last king to rule France, while his great-great-grandfather was Prince Napoléon Bonaparte, the cousin of the Emperor Napoleon III, France's most recent monarch.

Prince Napoléon
Jean-Christophe's grandfather, Louis, Prince Napoléon, died in 1997 and stipulated in his will that he wished his 11-year-old grandson Jean-Christophe to succeed him as Head of the Imperial House of France rather than the boy's father, Charles, who had embraced republican principles and decided to remarry without his father's consent. Despite the dynastic dispute, Jean-Christophe's father has stated that "there will never be conflict" between him and his son over the imperial succession.

Education and career
Jean-Christophe studied at Lycée Saint Dominique in Neuilly-sur-Seine from 2001 to 2004, obtaining a baccalauréat with honours in the sciences and mathematics. From 2004 to 2006, he studied economics and mathematics at the Institut Privé de Préparation aux Études Supérieures (IPESUP) in Paris. Jean-Christophe matriculated at the HEC School of Management in Paris, graduating in 2011 with an MSc in management.

He completed an MBA at Harvard Business School in May 2017. He worked from 2017 until 2022 as a private equity associate in the London office of the Blackstone Group. In April 2022 he founded a private equity boutique Leon Capital LLP.

He has lived and worked in New York City as an investment banking analyst for Morgan Stanley and in London as a private equity associate for Advent International. He is fluent in French, English and Spanish. He represents his dynasty's heritage at public events and ceremonies in France and elsewhere in Europe.

Personal life
On 17 October 2019, he contracted a civil marriage with Countess Olympia von und zu Arco-Zinneberg, by birth member of an ancient House of Arco at Neuilly-sur-Seine, France. On 19 October 2019, the couple were married religiously by the Roman Catholic bishop Antoine de Romanet at the Cathedral of Saint-Louis des Invalides in Paris. The wedding ball took place at the Palace of Fontainebleau.

Prince and Princess Napoléon have one son, Prince Louis Charles Riprand Victor Jérôme Marie Napoléon (b. 7 December 2022 in Paris), who is the current heir to the Bonaparte dynasty and legacy.

Honours

Foreign
 House of Bourbon-Two Sicilies: Deputy President Bailiff Knight Grand Cross with Collar of Justice of the Two Sicilian Sacred Military Constantinian Order of Saint George

Awards
 : Freeman of the City of London

Ancestry

References

External links
Website of the Mexico-France Napoleonic Institute  (In French and Spanish)
Fondation Napoléon
Renouveau Bonapartiste

1986 births
Living people
People from Saint-Raphaël, Var
House of Bonaparte
Princes Napoléon
Bonapartist pretenders to the French throne
French Roman Catholics
Princes of France (Bonaparte)
Paris-Sud University alumni
Harvard Business School alumni
Child pretenders